Laoag International Airlines was an airline based in the Philippines. It shut down when one of its aircraft, Flight 585 crashed in Manila Bay in 2002.

Code data
Laoag International Airlines Code Data.

IATA Code: L7
ICAO Code: LPN
Callsign: Laoag Air

Destinations
Laoag, Ilocos Norte
Manila
Basco, Batanes
Cebu City, Cebu
Tacloban, Leyte
Tuguegarao, Cagayan

References

Defunct airlines of the Philippines
Airlines established in 1995
Airlines disestablished in 2002
Laoag
Philippine companies established in 1995
2002 disestablishments in the Philippines